Snakeholme Pit is a nature reserve near Langworth in the county of Lincolnshire, England, managed and owned by Butterfly Conservation. It is 2 acres.

Animals seen include European water vole, water shrew, banded demoiselle, common blue, Essex skipper, purple hairstreak, emperor moth, rosy footman and the elephant hawk-moth.

The grassland is carefully managed  by volunteers from the Lincoln Conservation Group.

References

Butterfly Conservation reserves
Nature reserves in Lincolnshire